Howard E. Gendelman (born March 18, 1954) is an American physician-scientist whose research intersects the disciplines of neuroimmunology, pharmacology, and infectious diseases. Gendelman was born in Philadelphia, Pennsylvania. His research is focused on harnessing immune responses for therapeutic gain in HIV/AIDS and Neurodegenerative disease. He is the Margaret R. Larson Professor of infectious diseases and internal medicine at the University of Nebraska Medical Center (UNMC) in Omaha.

He is married with three children and seven grandchildren.

Early life and education 
Gendelman graduated with a bachelor's degree in Natural Sciences and Russian Studies from Muhlenberg College (1971-1975). He completed his doctorate of medicine at the Pennsylvania State University-Hershey Medical Center (1975-1979). He then completed a residency in Internal medicine at Montefiore Hospital, Albert Einstein College of Medicine (1979-1982), and he was a Clinical and Research Fellow in Neurology and Infectious Diseases at the Johns Hopkins University Medical Center (1982-1985).

Career 

Gendelman worked at the National Institute of Allergy and Infectious Diseases during the height of the HIV/AIDS Pandemic. Gendelman also occupied senior faculty and research positions at the Johns Hopkins Medical Institutions, the Uniformed Services University of the Health Sciences Center, the Walter Reed Army Institute of Research, and the Henry M. Jackson Foundation for the Advancement in Military Medicine before joining the faculty of UNMC in March 1993. He retired from the US Army with the rank of Lieutenant Colonel. He established the Center for Neurovirology and Neurodegenerative Disorders at UNMC in 1997, which evolved into UNMC's current Department of Pharmacology and Experimental Neuroscience in 2004. In 2000, he was awarded a Fulbright to do research at the Weizmann Institute of Science in Rehovot, Israel

Research

Mononuclear phacocytes and neurodegenerative disease 
Gendelman's research explores the role of mononuclear phagocytes (monocytes, macrophages, microglia, and dendritic cells) as viral reservoirs, perpetrators of disease, and depots for nanoformulated drug delivery. His work was foundational to building a field of investigation focused on lentiviral pathogenesis, diagnostics, and therapeutics. These advancements in immune transformation have led to new and effective management of neurodegenerative disease progression. Gendelman and his research team were among the first to develop laboratory assays for establishing viral tropism for mononuclear phagocytes, and they were the first to demonstrate that infected and immune activated mononuclear phagocytes release viral and cellular toxins that damage the nervous system.

HIV research contributions 
Gendelman's group was among the first to reverse HIV-dementia in an infected person using combination antiretroviral therapy (cART), and they developed scores of rodent models to mimic HIV/AIDS end-organ disease. He coined the term long-acting slow effective release ART (LASER ART). These works led to polymer discovery, targeted drug delivery to viral reservoirs, and reduction of residual virus in lymphoid organs. His Nebraska-based research group, along with a team at Temple University, was also the first to combine HIV reservoir-targeted LASER ART and CRISPR-Cas9 to eliminate chronic viral infection from infected animals. This curative approach (published in Nature Communications, 2019) received considerable attention in establishing a novel translational pathway for HIV eradication. This work followed the first ultra-long acting nanocrystal prodrug and the world's first HIV vaccine mimetic (in Nature Materials, 2020). His work with cell-based drug delivery born out of nanoparticle-mononuclear phagocyte interactions has inspired broad pharmaceutical interest; in turn, Gendelman led the establishment of the Nebraska Nanomedicine Production Plant, a biotechnology good manufacturing practices (cGMP) initiative, to position research for clinical translation in the development of long acting nanoformulated ART at UNMC. He also co-founded Exavir Therapeutics, Inc., a biotechnology company developing therapies towards and cure for HIV/AIDS.

Parkinson's Disease research contributions 
Gendelman was the first to pharmacologically transform effector into regulatory T cells to halt the progression of Parkinson's disease. Phase II investigation began in early 2021 after successful phase I investigations

Scientific community leadership 
Gendelman has written or edited 17 books and monographs (including multiple editions of the textbooks The Neurology of AIDS and Neuroimmune Pharmacology). He was the founding Editor-in-Chief of the Journal of Neuroimmune Pharmacology.

Awards and honors

Research recognitions 
Startup of the Year 2022 - Exavir Therapeutics
 Nebraska Coalition for Lifesaving Cures' 2022 Life Saver Award
 Lifetime Achievement Award, Contribution to the Advancement of the Mission of the Society on NeuroImmune Pharmacology, 2017
 Pioneer in NeuroVirology, International Society for NeuroVirology, 2016
 Javits Investigator Award, National Institutes of Health, 2000

References 

20th-century American physicians
HIV/AIDS researchers
1954 births
Living people
University of Nebraska Medical Center faculty
Muhlenberg College alumni
Physicians from Pennsylvania
Pennsylvania State University alumni
Physicians from Nebraska
People from Omaha, Nebraska
21st-century American physicians
Medical journal editors
Parkinson's disease researchers